Drew Russell (born 24 May 1988) is an Australian racing driver. He formerly competed in the Dunlop V8 Supercar Series and raced in the 2015 Supercheap Auto Bathurst 1000 with his family team, Novocastrian Motorsport.

Career summary

Production Cars
Russell starting in the Australian Production Car Championship in 2004 under the guidance of his father and former V8 Supercar driver Wayne Russell driving a Honda S2000. In 2005 he won finished second outright and won Class A.

V8 Supercars
In 2007, he moved into the Fujitsu V8 Supercar Series completing the whole season in his family run Novocastrian Motorsport team. He ran full time seven years in the series with a best result of seventh in 2013.  

In 2015 and 2016, he raced in only one event each season. 

2014 saw him switch to the third tier 2014 Kumho Tyres V8 Touring Car Series running in six races and finishing sixth in the series. 

In 2015, again in his family run Novocastrian Motorsport team, he and his brother Aaren qualified as a wildcard for the 2015 Supercheap Auto Bathurst 1000 finishing seventeenth.

Results

Career summary

Complete Bathurst 12 Hour results

Complete Supercars Championship results

Complete Bathurst 1000 results

Complete Bathurst 6 Hour results

References

External links
 Novocastrian Motorsport Official Site
 
 Drew Russell profile on US Racing Reference

1988 births
Living people
People from the Hunter Region
Australian racing drivers
Racing drivers from New South Wales